Mas Borracho is the fourth album by Infectious Grooves, released in 2000. The title, as written on the album, is "but drunk" in Spanish. However, it is most likely a misspell of "más borracho", meaning "more drunk" or "drunker".

Critical reception
The Sunday Herald Sun called the band "as technically perfect as any outfit", writing that the album contains "such perfect slow-funk tracks as 'Lock It In The Pocket' and 'Borracho'." Rock Hard wrote that "the music is as always: well played, pleasantly live-like and powerfully produced. But that doesn't hide the fact that Mike [Muir] and the like present us nothing more than boring funk-metal-rock with typically thin vocals."

Track listing
All songs by Mike Muir and Dean Pleasants, except where noted. 
 "Citizen of the Nation"  (Muir, Siegel, Pleasants, Trujillo) – 4:24    
 "Just a Lil Bit"  (Muir, Siegel, Pleasants, Trujillo) – 3:38    
 "Lock It in the Pocket"  (Muir, Siegel, Pleasants, Trujillo) – 3:36    
 "Good for Nothing"  – 4:26    
 "Borracho"  (Muir, Siegel, Pleasants, Trujillo) – 4:06    
 "Good Times Are out to Get You"  – 3:14     
 "Wouldn't You Like to Know"  (Muir, Siegel, Pleasants, Trujillo) – 2:55     
 "Going, Going, Gone"  (Muir, Siegel, Pleasants, Trujillo) – 5:28     
 "21st Century Surf Odyssey"  – 2:46     
 "Please Excuse This Funk Up"  – 4:37     
 "Fill You Up"  – 4:50     
 "What Goes Up"  – 3:55     
 "Leave Me Alone"  (Muir, Siegel, Pleasants, Trujillo) – 7:08
 "I May Be Ugly (But I'm Feeling Fine)" – 3:10 Bonus track on Japanese edition

Pneumonia EP 
   Suicidal Tendencies – "Su Casa Es Mi Casa" (*)  – 4:11
 My Head – "The Beard" (*)  – 3:41
 No Mercy Fool! – "Choosin' My Own Way of Life" (*)  – 2:43
 Creeper – "Rollin' in the Rain" (*)  – 4:57
 Cyco Miko –  "Strugglin'" (*)  – 3:01

Credits 
 Mike Muir – vocals
 Dean Pleasants – guitar
 Adam Siegel – guitar (tracks: 1 to 4, 6 to 9, 11, 13), keyboards (track: 10)
 Robert Trujillo – bass guitar (tracks: 1 to 5, 7 to 9, 11, 13)
 Josh Paul – bass guitar (tracks: 6, 10, 12)
 Herman Jackson – keyboards (track: 12)
 Brooks Wackerman – drums (tracks: 1 to 4, 6 to 13)
 Josh Freese – drums (track: 5)
Production
 Mike Blum – engineering, mixing
 Brian Gardner – mastering
 Adam Siegel – cover art
 Steve Siegrist – art direction

References

Infectious Grooves albums
2000 albums